is a Japanese politician of the Liberal Democratic Party, a member of the House of Representatives in the Diet (national legislature). A native of Kumagaya, Saitama and graduate of Chuo University, he had served in the city assembly of Kumagaya for three terms since 1971 and in the assembly of Saitama Prefecture for four terms since 1983. He was elected to the House of Representatives for the first time in 1999.

References

External links 
  in Japanese.

1939 births
Living people
Politicians from Saitama Prefecture
Chuo University alumni
Members of the House of Representatives (Japan)
Liberal Democratic Party (Japan) politicians
21st-century Japanese politicians